Please, Not Now! (original French title La Bride sur le cou, is a French comedy film released in 1961, directed by Roger Vadim and starring his former wife, Brigitte Bardot.

Synopsis
Brigitte Bardot plays Sophie, a young model who discovers her boyfriend is thinking of leaving her for another woman. She plots deadly revenge in this French romantic comedy.

Sophie is not content with the status quo in her relationship with high-flying reporter boyfriend Philippe (Jacques Riberolles), but she is even less impressed when a wealthy American girl, Barbara (Josephine James), threatens to steal him from her. She resolves to win Philippe back or murder her rival. She enlists her doctor friend Alain (Michel Subor) to aid her in making him jealous. Sophie and Alain travel from Paris to the ski resorts of Italy to chase Philippe and Barbara, treating us to marvelous French comedy in the mischief that ensues.

Directed by Bardot's former husband Roger Vadim, the film features a "nude" dance sequence, in which Bardot wore a body stocking. It was considered risqué at the time of the film's release and provoked controversy. Michel Subor was cast as Bardot's fraught suitor, in a role that made him famous.

Cast
Brigitte Bardot - Sophie
Michel Subor - Alain
Jacques Riberolles - Philippe
Josephine James - Barbara
Claude Brasseur - Claude

References

External links
 The Brigitte Bardot Foundation
 Roger Vadim at IMDb
 
 

Films directed by Roger Vadim
1961 films
1961 romantic comedy films
CinemaScope films
French romantic comedy films
1960s French films
1960s French-language films